The Battle of Fidenae was fought in 437 BC between the Roman Republic, led by the dictator Mamercus Aemilius Mamercinus, and the combined forces of Fidenae and Veii, led by Lars Tolumnius.

Background 
In 438 BC, the Roman colony of Fidenae revolted against the Roman Republic and allied itself instead with Veii. In response, the Senate sent four envoys to Fidenae (Tullus Cloelius, Gaius Fulcinius, Spurius Antius, and Lucius Roscius) in order to inquire into the Fidenate's motives. However, all four of these envoys were put to death on Tolumnius' orders. It is said that the Fidenates mistook a lucky dice roll by Tolumnius as an order to kill the envoys, but the historian Livy doubts the legitimacy of this story, suggesting that it was the intention of Tolumnius to have the Fidenates kill the Romans themselves in order to sow division between the two cities.

Battle of the Anio River 
Consequently, the consul Lucius Sergius Fidenas was first sent to Fidenae. He intercepted the combined forces of Fidenae and Veii on the southern shores of the Anio River. The ensuing battle was both bloody and indecisive, but it ultimately resulted in a Roman victory. This victory, however, was overshadowed by the great loss of life required to obtain it.

Battle of Fidenae 
After the initial engagement by the consul, Mamercus Aemilius Mamercinus was appointed as dictator, and Lucius Quinctius L. f. L. n. Cincinnatus as his magister equitum. The dictator appointed Titus Quinctius Capitolinus Barbatus and Marcus Fabius Vibulanus as his lieutenant-generals.

Following the appointment of a dictator, the enemy moved back to the northern shores of the Anio River and into the hills between Fidenae and the river. It was not until the Faliscians came to their aid that they moved back to Fidenae, encamping outside its walls. The dictator crossed the Anio and began in the direction of Fidenae. Meanwhile, the Faliscians began to dispute with the Fidenates and Veientes, who insisted that the battle be prolonged. However, Tolumnius succumbed, not wishing to lose the support of the Faliscians. The three armies lined up and waited for the Romans to engage first. The cavalry, led by Quinctius, was the first to advance, followed by the infantry. The enemy cavalry, led by Tolumnius himself, was the most resistant among the enemy,  but once Tolumnius was unhorsed and killed by Aulus Cornelius Cossus, the enemy began to lose morale. The cavalry was routed, and the Romans advanced into the enemy camp.
 
Prior to the battle, Tolumnius had sent a detachment around the nearby hills in order to sabotage the Roman camp behind their lines. The camp was successfully defended by the lieutenant-general Marcus Fabius Vibulanus.

Aftermath 
Mamercinus returned to Rome in triumph, during which Cossus was also honored for having slain the Etruscan king. The spoils were offered at the Temple of Jupiter Feretrius, near those of Romulus. Fidenae was captured by the dictator Quintus Servilius Priscus Structus Fidenas two years later.

References 

437 BC
Fidenae
Fidenae
5th century BC in the Roman Republic
430s BC conflicts